Bobby Mack (born June 19, 1954, Fort Worth, Texas, United States) is an American blues rock guitarist and singer based in Austin, Texas.

Career
During the 1970s, Mack played a mix of blues and rock in a covers band, Thrills, before forming his own Austin-based blues band Night Train,  and former Thrills drummer,  Steve Fulton. After various replacement personnel, Mack changed the band name to Bobby Mack & The Night Train to establish a firmer identity.

In 1996, Mack played guitar on, and produced, Little Willy Foster's debut album.

Discography
 Sugar All Night (1996)
 Live at J&J Blues Bar (1997)
 Highway Man (1998)
 Honeytrap (2003)
 Say What! (2004)
 Red Hot & Humid (2004)

References

External links
 

1954 births
Living people
American blues guitarists
American male guitarists
Lead guitarists
American blues singers
Blues rock musicians
Electric blues musicians
People from Fort Worth, Texas
Texas blues musicians
Singers from Texas
Guitarists from Texas
20th-century American guitarists
20th-century American male musicians